The ROV KIEL 6000 is a remotely operated vehicle built by Schilling Robotics, Davis, California. It's in the possession of the German GEOMAR - Helmholtz Centre for Ocean Research Kiel. The ROV has been designed for certain scientific tasks with a max. operational depth of 6,000 m (19,685 feet). The ROV is electrically powered and directly linked to the operating ship via a deep-sea glass fiber cable. It can be operated from ships of opportunity which fulfill certain requirements such as deck space and stability, power supply, dynamic positioning and crane/winch capacities.

ROV KIEL 6000 is used within multidisciplinary scientific projects such as the Cluster of Excellence "The Future Ocean" and for the installation and maintenance of ocean observatories.

Technical specifications

External links
 Technical Speciafications from the IFM-GEOMAR Website
 ROV KIEL 6000 GEOMAR Website

Remotely operated underwater vehicles
Robotic submarines
Ships built in California